Bernice is a town in Union Parish, Louisiana, United States. The population was 1,689 at the 2010 census, a decrease from 1,809 in 2000. It is part of the Monroe Metropolitan Statistical Area.

History
The area was part of the Louisiana frontier and pine forests, but early houses survive from the mid-nineteenth century: among the oldest homes are the R.T. Moore/Gresham/Stenzel House, known as the "Sweet Onion", and McCuller Log Cabin, both circa 1865.

Bernice was established in 1899 as a sawmill town after Captain C.C. Henderson built the Arkansas Southern Railroad, the first railway in Union Parish.  Also an agricultural trade center, Bernice is the youngest European-American town to be founded in the parish. The area was known as the "big woods" because of its large stands of huge virgin pine.  Henderson built the railroad to enable harvesting of lumber from the area. Moving south from Junction City, he directed construction of the railroad to Winnfield.

Henderson sought to purchase property about a mile north of the present town from Henry Mabry, but they could not agree on the price. Henderson moved south and bought land from Allen Lowery and Dave Cole.  He named his acquisition for Lowery's infant daughter, Bernice. On a late spring day, Henderson auctioned lots for the planned community.

Bernice was incorporated that same year, and the railroad depot was built soon after. A 1901 picture of Louisiana Street includes the depot, and a c. 1905 interior photograph shows the agent and several local citizens. Restored, today the station is operated as the Depot Museum, displaying a collection of Bernice memorabilia. It also serves as a tourist information center.

Jake Crews was the first mayor. He was a contractor who built many of the earliest homes. Still standing are his own 1900 house, now called the Caldwell Home and said to be the oldest house in town; the 1902 Garland/Reeder House; the 1903 J.W. Heard/Laurence/Patton House; and the 1904 Thomas Heard House.  Other turn-of-the century structures are the Cook/Minter House, the John Roach House and the Rives/Lindsey Hotel. The first brick home in town was the Pollock/Martin House, which dates from the 1920s, as does the old Bernice Jail.

The circa 1895 Alabama Methodist Church is now listed on the National Register of Historic Places. The Lynn Log House was moved to its present location and reconstructed from an antebellum dogtrot house that once stood across the road.

Captain Henderson donated land to the town to be named Oakhurst Park. It was filled with oak trees surrounding a gazebo where public functions were held during the early years. In 1938, the Bernice Clubhouse was built in the park, and it remains in use today. Nearby was the childhood home of New York Knicks basketball great Willis Reed.

The original town, as laid out by Henderson, has recently been designated as the Bernice Historic District by the town council.

The first store was in a tent and run by a man named Nelson, and the next was a mercantile business in a box car, operated by Will Martin. Other merchants soon followed, many of them coming from Shiloh, and the Bank of Bernice was chartered in 1901. With lumber the major factor in the economy, usually one mill, and often two, have operated here. A saloon and pool hall were among the early businesses, and it was not unusual to see a fight among lumbermen on Saturday afternoons in the middle of the red dirt main street under the sycamore trees.  In the early part of the century, the Bernice and Northwestern Railroad Company, also known as "the dummy line", headed northwesterly toward Summerfield to haul in the logs from the lumber camps along the way.

Although Bernice has changed from its rough and tumble early days, it still has a sawmill and a chip mill operating. The Lindsey warehouse complex of 63 buildings provides space for several timber-related industries. The town also has a hospital, a nursing home, a volunteer fire department, several churches, and numerous small businesses.

Geography

Major highways
  U.S. Highway 63/U.S. Highway 167
 Louisiana Highway 2

Demographics

2020 census

As of the 2020 United States census, there were 1,356 people, 571 households, and 326 families residing in the town.

2000 census
As of the census of 2000, there were 1,809 people, 668 households, and 452 families residing in the town. The racial makeup of the town was 56.94% African American, 36.87% White, 0.17% Native American, 0.50% Asian, 4.98% from other races, and 0.55% from two or more races. Hispanics or Latinos of any race were 6.63% of the population.

There were 668 households, out of which 31.9% had children under the age of 18 living with them, 39.2% were married couples living together, 25.4% had a female householder with no husband present, and 32.2% were non-families. 29.3% of all households were made up of individuals, and 14.4% had someone living alone who was 65 years of age or older. The average household size was 2.56 and the average family size was 3.17.

In the town, the population was spread out, with 27.7% under the age of 18, 11.1% from 18 to 24, 23.6% from 25 to 44, 18.5% from 45 to 64, and 19.2% who were 65 years of age or older. The median age was 35 years. For every 100 females, there were 79.8 males. For every 100 females age 18 and over, there were 68.8 males.

The median income for a household in the town was $20,602, and the median income for a family was $27,708. Males had a median income of $20,903 versus $17,083 for females. The per capita income for the town was $11,279. About 24.9% of families and 30.8% of the population were below the poverty line, including 39.4% of those under age 18 and 26.5% of those age 65 or over.

Education
Residents are assigned to Union Parish Public Schools. The Bernice school which served grades K-12 closed in 2013, and all students throughout Union Parish attend schools in the parish seat, Farmerville.

Notable people
 Benny Anders
 Robert Finley, musician
 Wahoo McDaniel, NFL player and professional wrestler
 Dante Powell, stand-up comedian
 Willis Reed, NBA player
 Willie Robertson, reality television star
 Orlando Woolridge, NBA player

References

External links
Town of Bernice

Towns in Louisiana
Towns in Union Parish, Louisiana
Towns in Monroe, Louisiana metropolitan area